Entomologia Generalis is a peer-reviewed scientific journal covering general and applied entomology. Established in 1978 as Entomologica Germanica by German entomologist Wilhelm August Steffan, the journal publishes original research on insects and arthropods in general. It particularly welcomes contributions examining "sustainable control strategies" of arthropod pests; beneficial arthropods; the impact of invasive pests; and the side effects of pest management.

The editorial team as of 2020 consists of an editor-in-chief, Nicolas Desneux, and a board of 29 associate editors.

References

External links

English-language journals
Entomology journals and magazines
Hybrid open access journals
Publications established in 1978
E. Schweizerbart academic journals